In Full Cry is a 1921 British silent drama film directed by Einar Bruun and starring Gregory Scott, Pauline Peters and Cecil Mannering.

Cast
 Gregory Scott as Blaise Palhurston 
 Pauline Peters as Pollie Hills 
 Cecil Mannering as Bob Foster 
 Philip Hewland as Frank C. Baynes 
 Charles Tilson-Chowne as John Shapcott 
 Stewart Rome

References

Bibliography
 Low, Rachael. History of the British Film, 1918-1929. George Allen & Unwin, 1971.

External links

1921 films
1921 drama films
British silent feature films
British drama films
Films directed by Einar Bruun
1920s English-language films
1920s British films
Silent drama films